Nokia 101 may be:
Nokia 101 (1992)
Nokia 101 (2011)